The Conservatoire du Bégonia (1,000 m2) is a botanical garden specializing in begonias. It is located at 1 rue Charles Plumier, Rochefort, Charente-Maritime, Nouvelle-Aquitaine, France, and open for guided tours several days per week in early spring and late fall; an admission fee is charged.

History
The conservatory was established in 1988 in honor of royal botanist Charles Plumier (1646–1704), who discovered begonias while on an American expedition, and Michel Bégon (1638-1710), expedition organizer and Rochefort intendant, for whom the flower was named in 1690. Thanks to their efforts, Rochefort was famed for its importation of exotic plants during the 17th-18th centuries, especially coffee. The conservatory's original 650 m2 floor space was extended in 1993 by a further 350 m2. Its collection has grown by trades, purchases, and expeditions to South America and Cameroon.

Today
Today the conservatory serves as the National Collection of the genus Begonia, and contains over 500 species and 1,000 hybrid varieties. It describes itself as the world's largest begonia collection.

See also 
 List of botanical gardens in France

References 
 Conservatoire du Bégonia
 Gralon.net description (French)
 Pays Rochefortais Tourisme description (French)
 Petit Futé description (French)

Gardens in Charente-Maritime
Botanical gardens in France
Rochefort, Charente-Maritime